Martina Müller may refer to:

 Martina Müller (tennis), German tennis player
 Martina Müller (footballer), German footballer
 Martina Müller, Austrian fashion designer, founder of Callisti label
 Martina Müller, German film historian and co-restorer of the 1955 film Lola Montès